Architectural propaganda is the use of architecture for the purpose of propaganda.

People's Republic of China

The People's Republic of China (PRC) is currently engaged in a prolonged public relations campaign with many other nations, the developing world particularly. This campaign has been termed a "charm offensive" by Joshua Kurlantzick in his book of the same name. Among the many elements of soft power used by the PRC is that of architecture. China has a rich architectural tradition to draw from and to publicize with. This allows the PRC government to promote tourism to famous architectural sites like the Great Wall or the Forbidden City. Furthermore, a rich architectural history combined with a desire to spread pro-PRC sentiment means that PRC funding of building projects abroad is increasingly common. ". . . Many scholars associated China's aid with giant white-elephant projects, like large buildings and ministries and similar structures."

In Mozambique, a former Portuguese colony possessed of largely Portuguese-style architecture, in the capital city, Maputo, the Ministry of Foreign Affairs building In East Timor, also a former Portuguese colony, the PRC funded and promoted the construction of that country's foreign ministry and funded the creation of a new East Timor embassy in Beijing despite the long-standing antagonism between the two parties.

The use of architecture to fuel tourism in the PRC has been highly successful. As of 2015, China is the fourth most visited country in the world, after France, United States, and Spain, with 56.9 million international tourists per year.  Foreign exchange income was 45.8 billion U.S. dollars, the world's fourth largest in 2010. The number of domestic tourist visits totaled 1.61 billion, with a total income of 777.1 billion yuan. While certainly all of this tourism cannot be attributed to architecture alone, a significant number of the tourist sites visited possess inherent architectural value.

Drug Cartel

Mexican drug cartels have utilized architecture as part of their overall propaganda campaign. Large houses called "narco mansions or narco castillos (drug mansions or castles)"  are becoming an increasingly common feature of the recent drug conflicts in Mexico. In order to overwhelm and sway over local populaces and potential rivals, these demonstrations of wealth and power are built at least partly for their psychological value.

Nazi

Nazi architecture adopted many elements of neoclassicism and of art deco in keeping with Adolf Hitler's personal fascination with Ancient Rome. Part of the Nazi cult involved the overaweing and subsuming of the individual into the greater German volk. This giving over of oneself to the whole was also expressed through Nazi architecture. The three primary expressed roles found in Nazi architecture are the (i)Theatrical, (ii)Symbolic, and (iii)Didactic, but each of these roles has its own place within the larger sphere of propaganda value.

Nazi architecture was designed to make the individual feel small and insignificant through its use of high ceilings. For example, at Nuremberg rallies, the feeling produced by the use of massed groups coupled with the architecture of the Zepplintribune architecture was to create wonder and a powerful feeling of community. Indeed, Hitler stated in one of his Nuremberg rally speeches, "Not every one of you sees me and I do not see every one of you. But I feel you and you feel me!". At the Nuremberg rallies, the overall effect of architecture was further enhanced through the use of many searchlights pointed directly upward in order to create a "Cathedral of Light" that even further served to invite the individual to buy into the Nazi worldview.

Another prominent conceptual feature of Nazi architecture was the "Theory of Ruin Value", first put forward by Albert Speer, Hitler's personal architect. This theory postulated that in order for a civilization's influence to pass beyond the existence of the civilization itself, it was important that aesthetically pleasing and impressive ruins be left by the dilapidated buildings of that civilization. This theory, too, took inspiration from the ancient Romans and Greeks in attempting to emulate the even architectural remains of their civilizations with Nazi ones in thousands of years. Since the original inspiration for Nazi architecture was itself, the ancient Romans and Greeks, it was important to Hitler that at the end of the Thousand Year Reich, the remains would inspire others as Roman ruins had done for him.

An interesting remaining piece of Nazi architecture can be found in the former Berlin Tempelhof Airport which closed all airport operations in 2008. The main terminal was designed and built during the late 1930s and early 1940s according to a design by Ernst Sagebiel following the ideas of Speer and Hitler including that of ruin value. It was designed to be the main hub for Hitler's redesigned Berlin, to be called Germania. When completed, it was the world's largest building and today, should the building fall into disrepair, Speer and Hitler's ruin value theory may be demonstrated.

References

Propaganda
Propaganda by medium